Neeliyar Bhagavathi is local Hindu deity in Mathamangalam India.

References 

Hindu deities